The 2011 São Léo Open was a professional tennis tournament played on clay courts. It was the first edition of the tournament which is part of the 2011 ATP Challenger Tour. It took place in São Leopoldo, Brazil between 31 October and 6 November 2011.

ATP entrants

Seeds

 1 Rankings are as of October 24, 2011.

Other entrants
The following players received wildcards into the singles main draw:
  Guilherme Clézar
  Franco Ferreiro
  André Ghem
  Bruno Sant'anna

The following players received entry as a special exempt into the singles main draw:
  Thiago Alves

The following players received entry as an alternate into the singles main draw:
  Martín Alund

The following players received entry from the qualifying draw:
  Marcelo Demoliner
  Pablo Galdón
  André Miele
  Marco Trungelliti

Champions

Singles

 Leonardo Mayer def.  Nikola Ćirić, 7–5, 7–6(7–1)

Doubles

 Franco Ferreiro /  Rubén Ramírez Hidalgo def.  Gastão Elias /  Frederico Gil, 6–7(4–7), 6–3, [11–9]

External links
ITF Search
ATP official site

2011 ATP Challenger Tour
2011 in Brazilian tennis
October 2011 sports events in South America
November 2011 sports events in South America
Clay court tennis tournaments
Tennis tournaments in Brazil
2011